Family Affair is an American sitcom starring Brian Keith and Sebastian Cabot that aired on CBS from September 12, 1966, to March 4, 1971. The series explored the trials of well-to-do engineer and bachelor Bill Davis (Keith) as he attempted to raise his brother's orphaned children in his luxury New York City apartment. Davis's traditional English gentleman's gentleman, Mr. Giles French (Cabot), also had adjustments to make as he became saddled with the responsibility of caring for 15-year-old Cissy (Kathy Garver) and the six-year-old twins, Jody (Johnny Whitaker) and Buffy (Anissa Jones).

Family Affair ran for 138 episodes in five seasons. The show was created and produced by Edmund Hartmann and Don Fedderson, also known for My Three Sons and The Millionaire.

Storyline
Indiana native William "Bill" Davis is a successful civil engineer who develops major projects all over the world.  A wealthy bachelor, Bill lives in a large apartment in Manhattan's Upper East Side, and has a British manservant, Giles French (usually called "Mr. French" or just "French"), as his valet.

A year prior to the series, Bill's brother Bob and his wife Mary were killed in a car crash in Indiana, orphaning their three children – teenager Cissy, and younger twins Jody and Buffy.  His other relatives believe that Bill is the one most capable of supporting them, so the three move in with him in New York.  Consequently, Bill's solitary lifestyle gets turned upside down.

Initially, "Uncle Bill" is none too pleased to have the three youngsters living with him, but he soon grows fond of them.  Mr. French, who effectively becomes a nanny in addition to his valet duties, is also flustered by the erratic situation at first, but he, too, develops an affinity for them.  Over time, the bachelor, the butler, and the three orphans find themselves becoming a close-knit family.

Other characters 

When Sebastian Cabot became ill, Giles's brother, Nigel "Niles" French (John Williams) was introduced. He worked for the Davis family for nine episodes in 1967, while Giles was said to be touring with the Queen in the Commonwealth countries. In the final season, Bill hired a part-time housekeeper, Emily Turner (Nancy Walker), to assist Mr. French.

Various other characters were also seen regularly, including several acquaintances of Mr. French's who are in service (most notably Miss Faversham, played by Heather Angel), colleagues of Bill's, and friends of Cissy's.

Production

Due to Don Fedderson's strong track record, Family Affair was sold to CBS even before the pilot had been filmed.

As Fedderson's other program, My Three Sons, had done for Fred MacMurray, Family Affair used a 60-day production schedule to accommodate Brian Keith. All of his scenes for the season would be shot in two 30-day blocks, while his co-stars would fill in after the actor's work was completed. This enabled Fedderson to harness movie stars like Keith and MacMurray into television commitments, while still enabling each to make motion pictures. As a result, each season had a single director for each of the 30-odd scripts.

Since the show's child actors (Whitaker and Jones) could only legally work eight hours a day, scenes with them were shot first, and as a result the cast and crew were often filming as many as four episodes at the same time.

Due to the popularity of the series with girls, Buffy's doll, "Mrs. Beasley" (which she often carried with her), was marketed as a Mattel talking toy in the United States. Mattel went on to produce two additional dolls, as well, patterned after Buffy: the "Tutti"-sized Buffy and larger "Small Talk Buffy" (talking doll), both of which featured accompanying miniature Mrs. Beasley dolls.

Opening
The theme song was composed by veteran television composer Frank DeVol. The opening featured credits appearing over a kaleidoscopic view of a multicolored array of gems and precious stones, suggesting "family jewels".

Most of the episodes in the fifth season opened with either Sebastian Cabot or the twins saying, "Good evening, so nice of you to join us," and closing the episode saying, "It's been very good of you to watch and we do hope to see you again next week on Family Affair."

Cast

 Brian Keith as Bill Davis - The part was first offered to Glenn Ford, who turned it down. Keith also held part ownership of the show.
 Sebastian Cabot as Giles French 
 Kathy Garver as Cissy Davis - Garver was cast at the last minute, in the middle of shooting the pilot, after the actress originally cast for the part gained 15 pounds on a trip to Europe. No scenes were filmed with Garver's predecessor.
 Johnny Whitaker as Jody Davis - Keith suggested Whitaker for the role. Jody and Buffy were originally supposed to be different ages, but after seeing how good Whitaker looked with Anissa Jones, who had already been cast, the producers decided to change them to twins.
 Anissa Jones as Buffy Davis
 Heather Angel as Miss Faversham, Mr. French's friend
 John Williams as Nigel "Niles" French (season 1)
 John Hubbard as Ted Gaynor, Bill's business partner (season 1)
 Betty Lynn as Miss Lee, Bill's secretary (seasons 1–2) 
 Sherry Alberoni as Sharon James, Cissy's girlfriend (seasons 1–3) 
 Karl Lukas as Scotty Parker, the doorman (seasons 1–3)
 Gregg Fedderson (producer Don Fedderson's son) as Gregg Bartlett, Cissy's boyfriend (seasons 2–5) - While working on the show Fedderson started dating Cissy actress Kathy Garver in real life.
 Nancy Walker as Emily Turner (season 5)

Notable guest stars

John Agar (episode 1.28)
Herbert Anderson (episode 4.1)
Dana Andrews (episode 4.2)
Joan Blondell (episode 2.13)
Lynn Borden
Richard Bull as the apartment manager
Terry Burnham (episode 2.15) as Ingrid, (episode 4.4) as Rita Stone
Veronica Cartwright (episode 3.27)
Jackie Coogan (episode 2.7)
Henry Corden (episode 1.8)
Brian Donlevy (episode 1.15)
Jamie Farr (episode 3.27) as a hippie
Paul Fix (episode 4.15)
Leif Garrett (episode 5.15)
Linda Kaye Henning (episode 5.9)
Kathleen Richards (episode 5.20)
Sterling Holloway (episode 1.19) as Mr. Frack, the window-washer
James Hong
Clint Howard (episode 5.10)
Martha Hyer (episode 2.14)
Kym Karath (episode 5.22) as Wynn Cartter
Andrea King (episode 1.17)
Patric Knowles (episode 2.3)
Anna Lee (episode 2.3)
June Lockhart (episode 3.5)
Myrna Loy (episode 1.20) as a maid candidate
Keye Luke (episode 1.18)
Ida Lupino (episode 4.12)
Ann McCrea
Lee Meriwether
Erin Moran
Butch Patrick (episode 3.2)
Larry Pennell
Eve Plumb (episode 3.7) as Eve, a terminally-ill girl
Robert Reed (episode 1.14) as professor Julian Hill
Pippa Scott (episode 2.30)
Doris Singleton (episode 2.29)
Ann Sothern (episode 2.17)
Vic Tayback as a police officer
Joyce Van Patten (episode 5.11)

Post-series
Anissa Jones (who played Buffy) died of a drug overdose in 1976, aged 18. Sebastian Cabot (who played Mr. French) died of a stroke in 1977, aged 59. Brian Keith (who played Uncle Bill) died by gunshot suicide in 1997, aged 75, two months after the suicide of his daughter, and an undetermined amount of time after he was diagnosed with cancer.

Episodes

Home media
MPI Home Video has released all five seasons of Family Affair on DVD in Region 1 by MPI Home Video (under license from the Don Fedderson estate).

Awards and nominations

Remake television series

A remake of Family Affair aired on The WB from September 12, 2002 to March 13, 2003. The remake was produced by Sid & Marty Krofft Pictures, Pariah Films, and Turner Television. Gary Cole played the role of "Uncle Bill" Davis and Tim Curry played Mr. Giles French. Fifteen episodes were produced, including the one-hour pilot, but only thirteen episodes were aired by The WB.

Planned spinoff television series
A Travis Hunt production titled Aunt Cissy and starring Cissy actress Kathy Garver was announced in the second quarter of 2019 as "a new family comedy that is not exactly a sequel to Family Affair... but it has elements of the premise of that classic TV series, plus a few surprises." Several episodes were shot in late 2019.

Appearances in other media
Gold Key Comics, an imprint of Western Publishing, published four issues of a Family Affair comic book series from January to October 1970.

Merchandising efforts centered on Anissa Jones' "Buffy" character. Several books were published, including the 1970 hardback Family Affair: Buffy Finds a Star by Gladys Baker Bond and Buffy's Cookbook. There were dolls (Mattel's "Small Talk Buffy" and Mrs. Beasley, Buffy's doll on the show) and various other toys.

A Mrs. Beasley doll, with her glasses missing, appears in the music video for the song "California Tuffy" by the Geraldine Fibbers.

In Police Academy 2: Their First Assignment, gang leader Zed (Bobcat Goldthwait) is seen tearfully watching the show in his hideout.

References

External links

 
 Behind-the-scenes production photos Collection of crew member Stephen Lodge.

1960s American sitcoms
1970s American sitcoms
1966 American television series debuts
1971 American television series endings
CBS original programming
English-language television shows
Television series about families
Television series by CBS Studios
Television series by Universal Television
Television shows set in New York City